Jules Lavigne (10 March 1901 – 1957) was a Belgian footballer. He competed in the men's tournament at the 1928 Summer Olympics.

References

External links
 

1901 births
1957 deaths
Belgian footballers
Belgium international footballers
Olympic footballers of Belgium
Footballers at the 1928 Summer Olympics
People from Uccle
Association football defenders
Footballers from Brussels